Li Xingcan (Chinese: 李星灿; born 23 July 1986 in Tianjin) is a Chinese football player who currently plays for Zibo Qisheng in the CMCL.

Club career
In 2006, Li Xingcan started his professional footballer career with Tianjin TEDA in the Chinese Super League.  He would eventually make his league debut for Tianjin on 10 March 2007 in a game against Shenzhen Ruby, coming on as a substitute for Chi Rongliang in the 82nd minute.
In February 2011, Li was loaned to China League One side Tianjin Runyulong until 31 December.
On 31 December 2011, Li transferred to China League One side Shenyang Shenbei. He moved to fellow League One side Tianjin Songjiang in February 2014.

On 4 February 2018, Li transferred to China League One side Zhejiang Greentown.
On 2 March 2019, Li was loaned to League Two side Hangzhou Wuyue Qiantang for the 2019 season.

Club career statistics 
Statistics accurate as of match played 12 October 2019.

Honours

Club
Tianjin Quanjian
China League One: 2016

References

External links
 

1987 births
Living people
Chinese footballers
Footballers from Tianjin
Tianjin Jinmen Tiger F.C. players
Tianjin Tianhai F.C. players
Zhejiang Professional F.C. players
Chinese Super League players
China League One players
Association football midfielders